Alucita nubifera is a moth of the family Alucitidae. It is found in Colombia.

References

Moths described in 1921
Alucitidae
Moths of South America
Taxa named by Edward Meyrick